The 1964 Connecticut Huskies football team represented the University of Connecticut as a member of the Yankee Conference during the 1964 NCAA College Division football season. Led by first-year head coach Rick Forzano, Huskies compiled an overall record of 4–4–1 with a mark of 2–1–1 in conference play, placing third in the Yankee Conference.

Schedule

References

Connecticut
UConn Huskies football seasons
Connecticut Huskies football